The 2019 WCHA Men's Ice Hockey Tournament was played between March 8 and March 23, 2019 on campus locations. By winning the tournament, Minnesota State was awarded the Broadmoor Trophy and received the WCHA's automatic bid to the 2019 NCAA Division I Men's Ice Hockey Tournament.

Format
The first two rounds of the postseason tournament featured a best-of-three games format. The top eight conference teams participated in the tournament. Teams were seeded No. 1 through No. 8 according to their final conference standings, with a tiebreaker system used to seed teams with an identical number of points accumulated. The higher seeded teams each earned home ice and host one of the lower seeded teams. (teams will NOT be re-seeded with each proceeding round).

The final was a single game held at the campus site of the highest remaining seed.

Standings

Bracket

Note: * denotes overtime periods

Results

Quarterfinals

(1) Minnesota State vs. (8) Alabama–Huntsville

(2) Northern Michigan vs. (7) Alaska

(3) Bowling Green vs. (6) Michigan Tech

(4) Lake Superior State vs. (5) Bemidji State

Semifinals

(1) Minnesota State vs. (4) Lake Superior State

(2) Northern Michigan vs. (3) Bowling Green

Championship

(1) Minnesota State vs. (3) Bowling Green

Tournament awards

Most Outstanding Player
Nick Rivera (Minnesota State)

References

WCHA Men's Ice Hockey Tournament
WCHA Men's Ice Hockey Tournament